Walter Sadler may refer to:

 Walter C. Sadler, mayor of Ann Arbor, Michigan
 Walter Dendy Sadler, English painter